Masauso Tembo (born 25 February 1976) is a Zambian retired football striker. He was a squad member at the 1998 and 2000 African Cup of Nations.

References

1976 births
Living people
Zambian footballers
Zambia international footballers
Zamsure F.C. players
Zanaco F.C. players
Al Urooba Club players
City of Lusaka F.C. players
Johor Darul Ta'zim II F.C. players
Lusaka Dynamos F.C. players
Atlético Petróleos de Luanda players
Association football forwards
Zambian expatriate footballers
Expatriate footballers in the United Arab Emirates
Zambian expatriate sportspeople in the United Arab Emirates
Expatriate footballers in Malaysia
Zambian expatriate sportspeople in Malaysia
Expatriate footballers in Angola
Zambian expatriate sportspeople in Angola
1998 African Cup of Nations players
2000 African Cup of Nations players